Kirill Sergeyevich Skachkov (born 6 August 1987 in Novokuznetsk) is a Russian table tennis player. In 2011 he won a silver medal in the doubles event in the Table Tennis European Championships. He was part of the Russian men's team at the 2012 Summer Olympics.

See also
 List of table tennis players

References

Russian male table tennis players
Table tennis players at the 2012 Summer Olympics
Olympic table tennis players of Russia
Living people
European Games competitors for Russia
Table tennis players at the 2015 European Games
1987 births
People from Novokuznetsk
Universiade medalists in table tennis
Universiade bronze medalists for Russia
Table tennis players at the 2019 European Games
Medalists at the 2013 Summer Universiade
Table tennis players at the 2020 Summer Olympics
Sportspeople from Kemerovo Oblast